Axel Thurel Sahuye Guessand (born 6 November 2004) is a French professional footballer who plays as a defender for Serie A club Udinese.

Club career
Guessand is a youth academy graduate of Nancy. He made his professional debut for the club on 28 August 2021 in a 4–1 league defeat against Auxerre. At the age of 16 years, 9 months and 22 days, this made him the youngest player ever to appear in a professional match for Nancy.

On 1 July 2022, Guessand joined Serie A club Udinese on a three-year deal.

International career
Guessand is a French youth international.

Career statistics

Club

References

External links
 
 

2004 births
Living people
People from Schiltigheim
Sportspeople from Bas-Rhin
Footballers from Alsace
Association football defenders
French footballers
France youth international footballers
Ligue 2 players
AS Nancy Lorraine players
Udinese Calcio players
French expatriate footballers
French expatriate sportspeople in Italy
Expatriate footballers in Italy